The Moore Islands, also known as the Moore Group, are a group of small islands in the North Coast region of British Columbia, Canada.  They are located in Hecate Strait to the west of Aristazabal Island.

References

{

Islands of British Columbia
North Coast of British Columbia